Total synthesis  is the complete chemical synthesis of a complex molecule, often a natural product, from simple, commercially-available precursors. It usually refers to a process not involving the aid of biological processes, which distinguishes it from semisynthesis. Syntheses may sometimes conclude at a precursor with further known synthetic pathways to a target molecule, in which case it is known as a formal synthesis. Total synthesis target molecules can be natural products, medicinally-important active ingredients, known intermediates, or molecules of theoretical interest. Total synthesis targets can also be organometallic or inorganic, though these are rarely encountered. Total synthesis projects often require a wide diversity of reactions and reagents, and subsequently requires broad chemical knowledge and training to be successful.

Often, the aim is to discover a new route of synthesis for a target molecule for which there already exist known routes. Sometimes, however, no route exists, and chemists wish to find a viable route for the first time. Total synthesis is particularly important for the discovery of new chemical reactions and new chemical reagents, as well as establishing synthetic routes for medicinally important compounds.

Scope and definitions
There are numerous classes of natural products for which total synthesis is applied to. These include (but are not limited to): terpenes, alkaloids, polyketides and polyethers. Total synthesis targets are sometimes referred to by their organismal origin such as plant, marine, and fungal. The term total synthesis is less frequently but still accurately applied to the synthesis of natural polypeptides and polynucleotides. The peptide hormones oxytocin and vasopressin were isolated and their total syntheses first reported in 1954. It is not uncommon for natural product targets to feature multiple structural components of several natural product classes.

Aims
Although untrue from a historical perspective (see the history of the steroid, cortisone), total synthesis in the modern age has largely been an academic endeavor (in terms of manpower applied to problems). Industrial chemical needs often differ from academic focuses. Typically, commercial entities may pick up particular avenues of total synthesis efforts and expend considerable resources on particular natural product targets, especially if semi-synthesis can be applied to complex, natural product-derived drugs. Even so, for decades there has been a continuing discussion regarding the value of total synthesis as an academic enterprise. While there are some outliers, the general opinions are that total synthesis has changed in recent decades, will continue to change, and will remain an integral part of chemical research. Within these changes, there has been increasing focus on improving the practicality and marketability of total synthesis methods. The Phil S. Baran group at Scripps, a notable pioneer of practical synthesis have endeavored to create scalable and high efficiency syntheses that would have more immediate uses outside of academia.

History

Friedrich Wöhler discovered that an organic substance, urea, could be produced from inorganic starting materials in 1828. That was an important conceptual milestone in chemistry by being the first example of a synthesis of a substance that had been known only as a byproduct of living processes. Wöhler obtained urea by treating silver cyanate with ammonium chloride, a simple, one-step synthesis:
 AgNCO + NH4Cl → (NH2)2CO + AgCl

Camphor was a scarce and expensive natural product with a worldwide demand. Haller and Blanc synthesized it from camphor acid; however, the precursor, camphoric acid, had an unknown structure. When Finnish chemist Gustav Komppa synthesized camphoric acid from diethyl oxalate and 3,3-dimethylpentanoic acid in 1904, the structure of the precursors allowed contemporary chemists to infer the complicated ring structure of camphor. Shortly thereafter, William Perkin published another synthesis of camphor. The work on the total chemical synthesis of camphor allowed Komppa to begin industrial production of the compound, in Tainionkoski, Finland, in 1907.

The American chemist Robert Burns Woodward was a pre-eminent figure in developing total syntheses of complex organic molecules, some of his targets being cholesterol, cortisone, strychnine, lysergic acid, reserpine, chlorophyll, colchicine, vitamin B12, and prostaglandin F-2a.

Vincent du Vigneaud was awarded the 1955 Nobel Prize in Chemistry for the total synthesis of the natural polypeptide oxytocin and vasopressin, which reported in 1954 with the citation "for his work on biochemically important sulphur compounds, especially for the first synthesis of a polypeptide hormone."

Another gifted chemist is Elias James Corey, who won the Nobel Prize in Chemistry in 1990 for lifetime achievement in total synthesis and for the development of retrosynthetic analysis.

Examples

One classic achievement of total synthesis is quinine total synthesis, which, before its total synthesis by Robert Burns Woodward and William von Eggers Doering in 1944, had a history of many partial syntheses that spanned 150 years and included disputes and frustration.

References

External links
 The Organic Synthesis Archive
 Total Synthesis Highlights
 Total Synthesis News
 Total syntheses schemes with reaction and reagent indices
 Group Meeting Problems in Organic Chemistry

 
Organic synthesis